Polyhymno colorata is a moth of the family Gelechiidae. It was described by Henry Legrand in 1966. It is found on the Seychelles (Aldabra, Cosmoledo, Menai).

References

Moths described in 1966
Polyhymno